Hinman is a surname. Notable people with the surname include:

 Arthur Hinman (1890–1915), Australian rules footballer
 Benjamin Hinman (1719–1810), American surveyor, soldier, and politician
 Bill Hinman (1892–1964), Australian rules footballer 
 Brian Hinman (born 1961), American entrepreneur
 George E. Hinman (1870–1961), Connecticut politician
 George Wheeler Hinman (1864–1927), American writer and publisher
 Harold J. Hinman (1877–1955), New York assemblyman and judge
 Harvey D. Hinman (1865–1954), New York state senator
 Jacqueline Hinman (born 1961), American businesswoman
 Lawrence M. Hinman (born 1942), American philosopher
 Paul Hinman (born 1959), Canadian entrepreneur and politician

See also
 Justice Hinman (disambiguation)